Poste Air Cargo, named Mistral Air until 30 September 2019, is an Italian cargo and former passenger airline headquartered in Rome and is a wholly owned subsidiary of Poste italiane. Its hubs are Brescia Airport and Leonardo da Vinci–Fiumicino Airport in Rome. The airline used to serve domestic scheduled and international charter passenger services which it ceased in mid 2018 while focusing on cargo operations since then.

History 

Mistral Air was established in 1981 by actor and former swimmer Bud Spencer (Carlo Pedersoli) and started operations in 1984.

It was wholly owned by TNT N.V. until March 2002 when TNT sold a 75% stake to Poste Italiane. The airline has also been contracted by the Holy See of the Vatican to fly Pilgrims to holy sites such as Lourdes, Fátima, Santiago de Compostela, Medjugorje across Mostar, Israel/Palestine (Holy Land), Poland and Mexico. The first flight went from Rome to Lourdes on 27 August 2007 transporting the vicar of Rome, Cardinal Camillo Ruini.

In May 2018, owner Poste Italiane announced that Mistral Air will cease all scheduled and charter passenger flights to focus on cargo operations from now on. The airline has been loss-making for years and recently lost a PSO contract for Italian domestic services as well.

Since October 1, 2019, Mistral Air was rebranded in Poste Air Cargo.

Destinations 
As of April 2021, Poste Air Cargo operates scheduled cargo flights to the following domestic destinations as well as 7 international services from their hub in Rome:

Latest passenger destinations served by Mistral Air brand were Cagliari, Catania, Naples, Palermo, Perugia, Brescia and Pescara in Italy as well as Tirana in Albania which all ceased by August 2018.

Fleet 

As of November 2020, the Poste Air Cargo fleet consists of the following aircraft:

References

External links

 Official website

Airlines of Italy
Cargo airlines
Airlines established in 1981
Companies based in Rome
Italian companies established in 1981